The 1983 KB Cup was the 10th edition of the NSWRFL Midweek Cup, a NSWRFL-organised national club Rugby League tournament between the leading clubs and representative teams from the NSWRFL, the BRL, the CRL, the QRL and the NZRL.

A total of 18 teams from across Australia and New Zealand played 17 matches in a straight knock-out format, with the matches being held midweek during the premiership season.

Qualified Teams

Venues

Preliminary round

Round 1

Quarter finals

Semi finals

Final

Player of the Series
 Ian Schubert (Manly-Warringah)

Golden Try
 Royce Ayliffe (Eastern Suburbs)

Sources
 https://web.archive.org/web/20070929092845/http://users.hunterlink.net.au/~maajjs/aus/nsw/sum/nsw1983.htm

1983
1983 in Australian rugby league
1983 in New Zealand rugby league